Interstate 595 (I-595), also known as the Port Everglades Expressway and unsigned State Road 862 (SR 862), is a  auxiliary Interstate Highway that connects I-75 and Alligator Alley in the west with Florida's Turnpike, I-95, Fort Lauderdale–Hollywood International Airport, US Highway 1 (US 1), and SR A1A before terminating at Port Everglades in the east. The Interstate route was conceived in 1969 and planned as an Interstate starting in 1974. Construction began in 1984, with the freeway opening in stages in the late 1980s, with completion in 1991. The reversible tolled express lanes opened in 2014.

Route description

The Interstate Highway begins in Sunrise as the eastern part of an interchange with I-75 on the southern and western ends (I-75 "north" leads into Alligator Alley on the west side) and the Sawgrass Expressway (SR 869) on the northern end. For most of its length, SR 84 (the former number for Alligator Alley) runs parallel to the freeway, acting as an access road on either side of the Interstate. From the western terminus, the highway heads east to Davie, acting as a commuter route between the western fringes of the populated part of Broward County and Fort Lauderdale. At University Drive (SR 817), I-595 goes below a partial stack interchange. Three miles east of that interchange, it meets with Florida's Turnpike and US 441. In Fort Lauderdale, I-595 intersects with I-95 at the northwestern end of the airport. At the eastern end of the airport, it has its final interchange with US 1 (which runs concurrently with SR A1A at the interchange), providing access to the airport and Port Everglades.  The eastern terminus consists of two lanes for US 1 southbound, two for US 1 northbound and two lanes for Port Everglades via Eller Drive. The exit for southbound US 1 has a ramp to the airport. SR A1A is not listed on the exit signs.

History

I-595 grew out of a freeway plan for connecting Port Everglades with Alligator Alley, first conceived in 1969 as the Port Expressway. In 1974, once I-75 was rerouted to Broward County on Alligator Alley as a part of its eastern connection from Naples, it was proposed to be built as an Interstate. When the southern terminus of I-75 was moved from Broward to Dade County at the Palmetto Expressway (SR 826)/Gratigny Parkway (SR 924) in the late 1970s, the construction of the trans-Broward expressway was delayed. However, in September 1978, the Federal Highway Administration (FHWA) officially added the eastern  of the route to the Interstate Highway System, with the official designation of I-595.

In the early 1980s, I-595 was planned to be partially a toll freeway to cover its cost of construction. By the time construction started on July 26, 1984, the tolls for the freeway vanished, and it was built with only minor changes in its route. The first section, between I-75 and Hiatus Road opened in May 1988, with the section between Florida's Turnpike and US 1 opening on February 24, 1989, and the last section, connecting the disjointed sections opening on October 21, 1989. The freeway was designated as I-595 on June 11, 1990, and the Rainbow Interchange with I-95 was completed on March 22, 1991, the last unfinished interchange of the original plan.

The portion of the freeway between I-95 and US 1 follows the right-of-way of the Port Everglades railroad tracks that had previously run from the CSX Transportation railroad to Port Everglades.

In 2002, I-595, along with most of Florida's Interstates, switched over from a sequential exit numbering system to a mileage-based exit numbering system. Numbers were changed again at about the time the express lanes were opened in early 2014.

On April 9, 2022, Pittsburgh Steelers quarterback Dwayne Haskins was killed after being struck by a dump truck near Davie when he was attempting to cross the westbound lanes of I-595 at 6:40 am near Fort Lauderdale–Hollywood International Airport and died at the scene.

Express lanes

The $1.8-billion (equivalent to $ in ) tolled SunPass express lanes project in the middle of the freeway to relieve the traffic congestion opened for test use on March 26, 2014, and started tolling on April 9, 2014. The express lanes will significantly improve the capacity and operations of the I-595 corridor by providing three additional at-grade lanes in the median of the corridor. The lanes will reverse direction in peak travel times (eastbound in the morning/westbound in the evening). To maximize the operational efficiency, the lanes will have tolls at varying rates throughout the day to optimize traffic flow, and access to and from the lanes will only be allowed west of 136th Avenue, east of US 441/SR 7, and through a direct connection to the median of Florida's Turnpike, removing long distance commuter traffic from the general purpose lanes. The Florida Department of Transportation (FDOT) will retain control of the toll revenue and toll rates.

Exit list

Mainline
Exits 1–7 feed into the SR 84 frontage roads.

Express lanes

Frontage roads

See also
 
 
 Dwayne Haskins

References

External links

 I-595 Express Improvement Project
 Florida @ SouthEastRoads - Interstate 595

95-5
95-5 Florida
5 Florida
Expressways in Florida
595
1990 establishments in Florida